Dorothy Williams may refer to:
 Dorothy Williams (activist), South African educator and anti-apartheid activist
 Dorothy Williams (serial killer), American serial killer 
 Dar Williams (Dorothy Snowden Williams), American pop folk singer-songwriter